Kamil Majchrzak was the defending champion but chose not to defend his title.

Federico Coria won the title after defeating Alex Molčan 7–6(7–1), 6–3 in the final.

Seeds

Draw

Finals

Top half

Bottom half

References

External links
Main draw
Qualifying draw

Moneta Czech Open - 1
2021 Singles